Million Jobs is a campaign group in the United Kingdom that aims to tackle youth unemployment. The group's name comes from the statistic that at the height of the post-2008 global recession over 1,000,000 people under the age of 25 were unemployed in the United Kingdom. The campaign is led by Lottie Dexter a former Comms Officer at the Centre for Social Justice.

Policies
The abolition of employer national insurance contributions for under 25s something labelled a "jobs tax".
An increase in apprenticeships and vocational routes as an alternative to higher education.
All organisations that government works with should be required to provide opportunities for young people.
A review of equality legislation to prevent employers giving "frank" feedback to help job seekers.
An increase in workplace mentoring.

More recently the group have supported an introduction of coding lessons in schools to replace an outdated I.T./computing curriculum.

Criticism
Most criticisms of the campaign allege a pro-conservative bias evident in policies such as support for workfare, opposition to increases in the minimum wage and opposition to wage subsidy schemes such as Labour's job guarantee. 
The New Statesman have criticised the group's links to the Conservative Party and the centre-right think tank the Centre for Social Justice. The New Statesman also object to the groups support for workfare whereby unemployed people are made to work for their unemployment benefits rather than a wage. The Political Scrap blog have criticised the group as an "astroturfing operation which purports to “represent” the young unemployed while advocating for tax cuts and the watering down of equality legislation".

See also
Youth unemployment in the United Kingdom

References

External links
Million Jobs

Unemployment in the United Kingdom
Youth unemployment